Westport Town Farm is a  open space preserve and historic farm complex located in Westport, Massachusetts along the bracken East Branch of the Westport River. The property, owned by the town of Westport and managed by the land conservation non-profit organization The Trustees of Reservations through contract since 2007, was once the town's poor farm and local infirmary.

The preserve includes hiking trails, working farmland, salt marsh frontage, an antique farmhouse, dairy barn, corn crib, and stone walls dating back to Colonial times. It is open to hiking, picnicking, cross country skiing, canoeing, and kayaking. The preserve trailhead is located on Drift Road in Westport.

References

External links
Westport Town Farm The Trustees of Reservations
Trail map
Westport Town Farm Interim Management Plan
Over the hill to the poor house: Revisiting the story of the Westport Poor Farm

Protected areas of Bristol County, Massachusetts
The Trustees of Reservations
Farms in Massachusetts
Open space reserves of Massachusetts
Buildings and structures in Bristol County, Massachusetts
Tourist attractions in Bristol County, Massachusetts
2007 establishments in Massachusetts
Protected areas established in 2007